Omar Sharif (1932–2015) was an Egyptian actor

Omar Sharif may also refer to:

 Omar Sharif Jr. (born 1983), Egyptian model and actor; grandson of Omar Sharif
 Omar Sharif, fictional character in the film War, Inc.
 Omar Khan Sharif, one of the perpetrators of the Mike's Place suicide bombing in 2003

See also 
 Umer Shareef (1960–2021), Pakistani actor